The European route E 63 is a European route that goes from Sodankylä, Finland to Turku, Finland.

 E 63: Sodankylä – Pelkosenniemi – Kemijärvi – Isokylä – Kuusamo – Suomussalmi – Kajaani – Iisalmi – Kuopio – Vehmasmäki – Suonenjoki – Laukaa – Jyväskylä – Jämsä – Orivesi – Tampere – Akaa – Loimaa – Turku

The E63 is the only European route that runs entirely in Finland. It follows Finnish national highway 5 between Sodankylä and Kuopio and highway 9 between Kuopio and Turku.

External links 

 UN Economic Commission for Europe: Overall Map of E-road Network (2007)

63
E063
Roads within the Arctic Circle